Tollette is a town in southern Howard County, Arkansas, United States. The population was 240 at the 2010 census, down from 324 in 2000.

Geography
Tollette is located in southern Howard County at  (33.819078, -93.895742). Arkansas Highway 355 passes through the town, leading north  to Mineral Springs and south  to Fulton and Interstate 30.

Demographics

2020 census

As of the 2020 United States census, there were 185 people, 108 households, and 72 families residing in the town.

2000 census
As of the census of 2000, there were 324 people, 136 households, and 90 families residing in the town.  The population density was 133.1/km (343.0/mi2).  There were 149 housing units at an average density of 61.2/km (157.7/mi2).  The racial makeup of the town was 0.62% White, 98.46% Black or African American, and 0.93% from two or more races.

There were 136 households, out of which 24.3% had children under the age of 18 living with them, 33.8% were married couples living together, 29.4% had a female householder with no husband present, and 33.1% were non-families. 31.6% of all households were made up of individuals, and 16.9% had someone living alone who was 65 years of age or older.  The average household size was 2.38 and the average family size was 3.01.

In the town, the population was spread out, with 24.1% under the age of 18, 10.5% from 18 to 24, 24.7% from 25 to 44, 22.5% from 45 to 64, and 18.2% who were 65 years of age or older.  The median age was 37 years. For every 100 females, there were 90.6 males.  For every 100 females age 18 and over, there were 86.4 males.

The median income for a household in the town was $24,688, and the median income for a family was $31,250. Males had a median income of $19,063 versus $18,295 for females. The per capita income for the town was $10,589.  About 11.7% of families and 18.5% of the population were below the poverty line, including 17.5% of those under age 18 and 40.0% of those age 65 or over.

Notable person
 Luenell, actress and comedian

References

Towns in Howard County, Arkansas
Towns in Arkansas